The SS Charles S. Price was a steel-hulled ship lost on Lake Huron on November 9, 1913 during the Great Lakes storm of 1913. Twenty eight people died.

The Price was found on November 10, 1913 with her bow above water, and her stern dipping below. Because of her disposition, the ship's length could not be measured to make a positive identification of the vessel: the wreck was initially assumed to be the Regina. The vessel was eventually identified as the Price before she sank on November 17.

The salvage rights to the Price were sold to the Great Lakes Towing and Wrecking company. In the summer of 1916, salvage of the Price was attempted. Divers cut a hole in the side of the aft hull. The hole allowed divers to enter the wreck. They attempted to seal breaks in the hull and built bulkheads so that the wreck could be floated. However, salvaging the wreck was eventually considered too costly to be worth the expense and the Great Lakes Towing and Wrecking company abandoned attempts to raise her.

Salvage rights were eventually sold to the American Salvage Co., but they too were unable to salvage the wreck.

References

Maritime incidents in 1913
Shipwrecks of Lake Huron
Ships lost with all hands
1910 ships
Ships built in Lorain, Ohio
Great Lakes freighters